The Imbert–Fiodaraŭ effect (named after Fiodar Ivanavič Fiodaraŭ (1911 – 1994) and Christian Imbert (1937 – 1998) is an optical phenomenon in which a beam of circularly or elliptically polarized light undergoes a small sideways  shift, when refracted or totally internally reflected. The sideways  shift is perpendicular to the plane containing the incident and reflected beams. This effect is the circular polarization analog of the Goos–Hänchen effect.

References
 
 
 
 

Optical phenomena